The Niagara Falls Canucks are a junior ice hockey team based in Niagara Falls, Ontario, Canada.  They play in the Golden Horseshoe division of the Greater Ontario Junior Hockey League.

History
The Canucks moved up from Intercounty Junior C in 1971 to the Niagara District Junior B Hockey League.  They stayed with the league until 1979 when the league folded.

The Canucks have been a charter member of the Golden Horseshoe "B" since 1979.  For a short time in the 1990s, the teams was known as the Devils.

During the 2006 Playoffs, the Canucks won the GHJHL Championship, but ended up falling to the Midwestern Junior B Hockey League's Cambridge Winterhawks 4-games-to-1 in the Sutherland Cup final. The current captain of the Canucks is Ben Evans.

Current

The Niagara Falls Canucks relocated from Niagara Falls Memorial Arena to the Gale Centre prior to the 2011 season.  Niagara Falls native Cam McLean was named captain during the grand opening of the new facility.

Season-by-season results

Sutherland Cup appearances
1987: St. Thomas Stars defeated Niagara Falls Canucks 4-games-to-none
1989: St. Michael's Buzzers defeated Niagara Falls Canucks 4-games-to-1
1996: Niagara Falls Canucks defeated St. Thomas Stars 4-games-to-2
1998: Niagara Falls Canucks defeated Elmira Sugar Kings 4-games-to-3
2006: Cambridge Winterhawks defeated Niagara Falls Canucks 4-games-to-1
2011: Elmira Sugar Kings defeated Niagara Falls Canucks 4-games-to-1

External links
Canucks Webpage
GOJHL Webpage

Golden Horseshoe Junior B Hockey League teams
Sport in Niagara Falls, Ontario